The 1920 Summer Olympics, officially known as the Games of the VII Olympiad and commonly known as Antwerp 1920 (Dutch and German: Antwerpen 1920), were an international multi-sport event held in 1920 in Antwerp, Belgium.  Twenty-nine nations and 2,678 competitors, including 65 women, competed in 162 events in 29 sports.

Archery

Athletics

Boxing

Cycling

Road cycling

Track cycling

Diving

Men

Women

Equestrian

Fencing

Field hockey

Figure skating

Football

Gymnastics

Ice hockey

Modern pentathlon

 Gustaf Dyrssen
 Erik de Laval
 Gösta Runö

Polo

Rowing

Rugby union

Sailing

Shooting

Swimming

Men's events

Women's events

Tennis

Tug of war

Water polo

Weightlifting

Wrestling

Greco-Roman

Freestyle

See also
 1920 Summer Olympics medal table

Notes

References

External links

medal winners
Lists of Summer Olympic medalists by year